Mal Awan is a village in Union Council Changa Bangial, an administrative subdivision, of Gujar Khan Tehsil in the Punjab Province of Pakistan.

Language 
The local language is Punjabi (in Potohari dialects). Urdu, being the national language, is also used.

Location 
It is about fifteen kilometers from the Tehsil capital Gujar Khan and is located at 33°19'14N 73°20'33E.

Demography 
The number of its population is estimated to be 2,000 persons.

A large community of its residents reside in UK, middle east, and other countries of Europe.

Education 
 GPS Mal Awan 
 GGES Mal Awan 
 GHS Changa Maira 
 Al-Waris Girls Elementary Education Foundation Mal Awan

References

External links

Villages in Gujar Khan Tehsil